Dovetail may refer to:

 Dovetail (album), a 1983 album by Lee Konitz's Terzet
 Dovetail (company), an Australian-based software company
 Dovetail Games, a UK video game developer
 Dovetail joint, used in woodworking
 Dovetail Joint (band), a Chicago-based band
 Dovetail or riffle, a method of shuffling playing cards
 Daniel Dovetail, Daisy Dovetail, Dora Dovetail, characters in The Ickabog by J. K. Rowling
 The Dovetail Group, a 1984 early video game developer
 German equatorial mount or dovetail plate, used to fix a telescope to its mount

See also
 Dovetailing (computer science), a technique in algorithm design
 Dovedale (disambiguation)